Babasónicos is an Argentine rock band, formed in the early 1990s along with others such as Peligrosos Gorriones and Los Brujos. After emerging in the wave of Argentine New Rock bands of the late 1980s and early 1990s, Babasonicos became one of the banner groups of the "sonic" underground rock movement in Argentina in the late 1990s.

The band name refers partly to Sai Baba, the Indian guru, and partly to The Jetsons, whose Spanish version is called Los Supersónicos (The Supersonics).

The lead singer Adrián "Dárgelos" Rodríguez and the keyboardist Diego "Uma-T" Tuñón initially decided to create a new style, which would not follow the established Argentine music. The other official band members are: Diego "Uma" Rodríguez (guitarist and lead singer), Diego "Panza" Castellano (drummer), Mariano "Roger" Domínguez (guitarist), and Gabriel "Gabo" Manelli (bassist, deceased).

For their second album, Trance Zomba (1994), they incorporated a guest DJ, "DJ Peggyn" who would eventually remain as a band member until after releasing Miami (1999). This same year the band saw the departure of their longtime manager Cosme.

In 1999, they collaborated with Ian Brown on a song that bears their name on his album Golden Greats.

In 2001, the band released Jessico, their most commercially successful and critically acclaimed album up to that point, reaching a broad mainstream audience with singles like "Los Calientes", "El Loco" and "Deléctrico".

The following records, Infame (2003), Anoche (2005) and Mucho (2008) continued with a streak of critical praise and commercial success, each one being selected by several media outlets as one of the best Argentine albums of their respective years.

Babasonicos also composed the soundtrack for Vera Fogwill's movie Las Mantenidas Sin Sueños (Kept and Dreamless), which was released in 2007. The album was composed in 2003.

On January 12, 2008, the band posted an entry on their official site in which they informed that their longtime bassist, Gabriel Manelli had died as a result of Hodgkin's disease, which he had been suffering since the tour supporting the album Infame. Multi-instrumentalist and long-time friend Carca joined the group in replace of Manelli in their 2011 album A Propósito.  

They released their latest album Trinchera, in 2022.

Discography

Studio albums
 Pasto (1992)
 Trance Zomba (1994)
 Dopádromo (1996)
 Babasónica (1997)
 Miami (1999)
 Jessico (2001)
 Infame (2003)
 Anoche (2005)
 Mucho (2008)
 A propósito (2011)
 Romantisísmico (2013)
 Discutible (2018)
 Trinchera (2022)

Awards and nominations

Interviews
The Scenestar - March 2007

References

External links
Official website
Official MySpace

Argentine rock music groups
Rock en Español music groups
Musical groups established in 1991
EMI Latin artists
Latin Grammy Award winners
1991 establishments in Argentina